Harold Rosen is executive director of the Grassroots Business Fund. Rosen holds Bachelor's and master's degrees in Regional Science from the University of Pennsylvania, and an MBA from Harvard Business School.

Early years
Rosen joined the World Bank Group in 1978 through the Young Professionals Program Early assignments included: Investment Officer in IFC's Latin America and Africa Departments; IFC's Manager for Financial Planning and Policy; and Member of the task force starting IFC's operations in the former Soviet Union.

In 1992, Rosen became a Manager in IFC's Asia Department, covering Southeast Asia and the Pacific. He was instrumental in starting IFC's operations in the Mekong region, including both IFC's investment and technical assistance program, establishing the Mekong Private Sector Development Facility.

In 1997, Rosen was promoted to Director of Central and Southern Europe Department.  He also played a major role in starting IFC's microfinance activities, as well as creating Southeast Europe Enterprise Development (SEED), another of IFC's technical assistance facilities.

Small and Medium Enterprises
In March 2000, Rosen was assigned to start up and head the Small and Medium Enterprise Department (SME), a joint department of IFC and the World Bank.  Its mandate was to support expansion of and strengthen the World Bank Group's SME work. Today, the SME department's main functions include Portfolio Management, Results Measurement, Donor Relationships and knowledge Management and Learning Programs.

In December 2003 Rosen started and led IFC's Grassroots Business Initiative (GBI). GBI aimed to strengthen and scale up enterprises that create sustainable economic opportunities for the poor and marginalized. Grassroots Business Organizations are double bottom line business ventures, whether for-profit or not-for-profit, which empower and engage those at the “base of the pyramid” as entrepreneurs, suppliers, consumers and employees. These businesses provide sustainable income, training and needed products and services to those who need them most.

Rosen is also credited with starting the Pangea Artisan Market & Café.  Under the theme of economic empowerment of women, Pangea has an educational component that allows visitors to scan each item into interactive kiosks and learn the stories of the female artisans from developing countries.

Rosen spun the Grassroots Business Fund out of the International Finance Corporation (IFC) in 2008. Fifteen million dollars of the first fund came from the IFC with the rest coming from Omidyar Network and some foundations, individuals and government agencies. The money came to GBF as grants and much of it was invested in a mix of equity, quasi-equity, and debt in some 28 enterprises in Latin America, Africa, India, and Southeast Asia.

References

External links
www.gbfund.org
BBC's Business Daily Program with Harold Rosen

Living people
American businesspeople
University of Pennsylvania alumni
Harvard Business School alumni
Year of birth missing (living people)